Excelia is a French private university-level institution of higher education. Created in 1988 as Groupe Sup de Co La Rochelle, it is a non-profit organisation linked to the La Rochelle Chamber of Commerce and Industry (CCI) and a member of the Conférence des Grandes Écoles. Excelia Group's Business School belongs to the approximately 100 business schools worldwide (corresponding to roughly 1% of all business school) holding a triple accreditation.

History

Founded in 1988, the then Groupe Sup de Co La Rochelle has been a permanent member of the Conférence des Grandes Écoles since 2005.

In September 2016, Excelia acquired a majority share of the ESCEM Business School in Tours and Orléans which was then fully integrated into Excelia. 

Excelia has now 5,000 students and nearly 40,000 Alumni.

Schools

Excelia is organised into five schools:

 Excelia Business School
 Excelia Tourism School
 Excelia Digital School
 Excelia Academy
 Excelia Executive Education
The historical campus of Excelia Group is located in La Rochelle and 2 additional campuses are in Tours and Orléans. 

Excelia programs are also offered in Niort, Rochefort, Angoulême and Cognac. 

2 overseas associate campuses are located in New Rochelle, NY and Beijing.

Accreditation

Excelia is accredited by The French Ministry of Education.

Excelia Business School is EFMD-EPAS accredited since 2011 and AACSB accredited since 2013. As of summer 2020, Excelia Business School is bearer of the triple crown, thus joining the league of roughly 100 triple-accredited business schools worldwide. 

Excelia Tourism School holds the TedQual accreditation, delivered by the World Tourism Organisation (UNWTO), for all its programs in Tourism Management. The school is the first and only French institution of higher education to obtain TedQual accreditation for both Bachelor and MBA programs.

Rankings 

In 2022, the Financial Times ranked its Masters in Management program 36th in the world. Excelia Business School (former La Rochelle Business School) entered the Financial Times ranking of European Business Schools at ranks between 76 (2014) and 63 (2020).

Programs

Excelia Business School

DBA programme in Tourism & Hospitality Management
 DBA in Tourism and Hospitality Management: 4-year programme for experienced managers in the hospitality and tourism sectors, intended for managers with an MBA (or equivalent qualification) and extensive professional experience.

Master Program (Programme Grande Ecole)
 ESC Master in Management, the Programme Grande Ecole, is leading to a Master in Management. Each student spends 6 to 12 intensive months in another university of the world.

Bachelor programs
 Bachelor in International Business: 4-year program after French Baccalaureate or International Baccalaureate, including 2 years of studies abroad with possibility of double degrees (English and French tracks are available).
 Bachelor Business : 3-year general business program after French Baccalaureate or International Baccalaureate, giving access to a various list of positions in French or foreign companies (taught in French, no English track).
 Bachelor in Management of Tourism : 3-year specialised program in tourism after French Baccalaureate or International Baccalaureate, very popular for many major tourism companies (English and French tracks are available).
 The School also offers since 1999 two ranges of MBA Programs :

Specialized MBAs

 Environment and Sustainable Development Strategy
 Internationalisation and Audit/Consulting
 Bank and Customer Relationship Management
 Premium and Luxury Products Marketing
 International Corporate Strategy
 Purchasing and Supply Chain Management
 Event Management Organisation
 Applied Industrial Management

Excelia Tourism School

MBA Tourism and Services

 Touristic Destination Management
 Hospitality Management
 Sport Management

Excelia Digital School

 BA in Web Design and Graphic Communication
 MSc in Digital Communications and Influence Strategy

Partner universities (selection) 
Excelia has partnerships or dual-degree programs with more than 200 universities.
Alpen-Adria University Klagenfurt, Austria
 Northern Arizona University, USA
 University of Economics in Prague, Czech Republic
 University of Southern Denmark, Denmark
 University of Bamberg, Germany
 Athens University of Economics and Business, Greece
 National University of Ireland, Ireland
 University of Limerick, Ireland
 LUISS Business School, Italy
 Oxford Brookes University, UK
 Gdańsk University of Technology, Poland
 Warsaw School of Tourism and Hospitality Management, Poland
 Lomonosov State University Moscow, Russia
 University of Granada, Spain
 Linnaeus University, Sweden
 Plymouth University, UK
 Beihang University, China (partner campus)
 Newcastle University, UK

Alumni network 

The student alumni network consists of more than 40,000 professionals currently working in more than 150 countries.

References

External links 
 Official website

Business schools in France
Educational institutions established in 1988
Universities and colleges in La Rochelle
1988 establishments in France